"Right Here, Right Now (My Heart Belongs to You)" is a song originally written by the Swede Jörgen Elofsson for Idol series in Sweden. It became the lead single for Agnes, the winner of Pop Idol 2005 in Sweden, from her eponymous debut album (2005). The song was later covered by Raffaëla Paton, the winner of Idols 2006 in the Netherlands. Both versions debuted and peaked at #1. The original version by Carlsson held the number one spot in Sweden for six weeks.

Agnes version
The song appears on her debut album Agnes.

Track listings
CD single
"Right Here Right Now (My Heart Belongs to You)" – 4:09
"Right Here Right Now (My Heart Belongs to You)" [Instrumental] – 4:09

Chart performance

Weekly charts

Year-end charts

Raffaëla version

Track listing
CD single/Digital download
"Right Here Right Now (My Heart Belongs to You)" – 3:36
"Right Here Right Now (My Heart Belongs to You)" [Instrumental] – 3:37

Music video
The music video to Raffaëla's "Right Here, Right Now" contains scenes of the performance of the song on Idols. It also contains images of when Raffaëla was a little girl and when she received her platinum single award.

Chart performance

References

External links
Watch Raffaëla's Right Here, Right Now videoclip.
Agnes' chart history

2006 debut singles
2006 songs
Agnes (singer) songs
Raffaëla Paton songs
Songs written by Jörgen Elofsson
Dutch Top 40 number-one singles
Number-one singles in Sweden